Crossroads Christian Academy might refer to:
Crossroads Christian Academy, Corozal, Panama

Crossroads Christian School, Corona, California

Crossroads Christian School, West Plains, Missouri

See also
Crossroads Christian Church, a megachurch in Corona, California